WSCY (106.9 FM) is a radio station broadcasting a new country format. Licensed to Moultonborough, New Hampshire, United States, the station serves the Lakes Region.  The station is currently owned by Northeast Communications Corporation and features programming from Westwood One and a live morning show hosted by Joyce Danas.

The station broadcasts with an ERP of 4300 watts from Parade Road in Laconia, New Hampshire. The station's studios are located in Franklin, New Hampshire, along with sisters WFTN AM–FM and WPNH AM–FM.  WSCY is owned by local broadcaster Northeast Communications, headed by Jeff Fisher.

The station does not stream its signal over the internet.

Former logo

References

External links

SCY
Radio stations established in 1993
Carroll County, New Hampshire
Country radio stations in the United States
1993 establishments in New Hampshire